Al-Amqat is an archaeological site in al-Dakhaliyah, Oman. Located on a slope to the north of the oasis, the cemetery dates to the Samad Late Iron Age.

Description
The site was discovered in 1991, during road-building operations. German archaeologists Paul Yule, Gerd and Angelica Weisgerber and Manfred Kunter conducted a rescue excavation in response.

The preservation of the graves was excellent and they were not robbed. Five graves were salvaged. Particularly interesting was the intact grave of a warrior and another of a woman with numerous beads. A few years thereafter the cemetery was largely destroyed by road builders.

See also
 Archaeology of Oman

References
Paul Yule, Die Gräberfelder in Samad al-Shan (Sultanat Oman): Materialien zu einer Kulturgeschichte (2001), .
Paul Yule, Cross-roads – Early and Late Iron Age South-eastern Arabia, Abhandlungen Deutsche Orient-Gesellschaft, vol. 30, Wiesbaden 2014, 
Paul A. Yule, Valourising the Samad Late Iron Age, Arabian Archaeology and Epigraphy 27/1, 2016, 31‒71.

References

External links
http://heidicon.ub.uni-heidelberg.de/pool/oman

History of Oman
Archaeological sites in Oman